Around the Bend is the nineteenth studio album released in 2008 by American country music artist Randy Travis. The album is Travis' first mainstream country music album since 1999's A Man Ain't Made of Stone as all his other studio albums in the 2000s were composed of Christian country music. It sold 31,000 copies in its first week of release, the best opening week of Travis' career. Three singles were released from the album: "Faith in You", "Dig Two Graves" and "Turn It Around", none of which charted.

Around the Bend was nominated for best country album at the 51st Grammy Awards, and the track "Dig Two Graves" was nominated as best country song.

Track listing

Personnel
 Dan Dugmore - pedal steel guitar
 Larry Franklin - fiddle
 Paul Franklin - fiddle, pedal steel guitar
 Carl Gorodetzky - string contractor
 Tania Hancheroff - background vocals
 Aubrey Haynie - fiddle, mandolin
 Wes Hightower - background vocals
 Sherilynn Huffman - background vocals
 David Hungate - bass guitar
 Rob Ickes - dobro
 Paul Leim - drums
 Brent Mason - 12-string electric guitar, electric guitar
 Gordon Mote - Hammond organ, piano, Wurlitzer
 The Nashville String Machine - strings
 Steve Nathan - Hammond organ, piano, Wurlitzer
 Dan Seals - background vocals
 Lisa Silver - background vocals
 Bryan Sutton - banjo, acoustic guitar, hi-string guitar, mandolin
 Randy Travis - lead vocals
 Dianne Vanette - background vocals
 Bergen White - conductor, string arrangements
 Casey Wood - cymbals, shaker, tambourine

Charts

Weekly charts

Year-end charts

Awards 

The album won a Dove Award for Country Album of the Year at the 40th GMA Dove Awards.

References

External links 

2008 albums
Randy Travis albums
Warner Records albums
Albums produced by Kyle Lehning